Cuba competed at the 1996 Summer Olympics in Atlanta, United States. 164 competitors, 111 men and 53 women, took part in 84 events in 15 sports.

Due to the hostilities in the US-Cuban relations, Cuban athletes were only allowed to travel to Atlanta following the permission of its local NOC, to avoid any possibility of defections.

Medalists

Gold
 Maikro Romero — Boxing, men's flyweight (51 kg)
 Héctor Vinent — Boxing, men's light welterweight (63,5 kg)
 Ariel Hernández — Boxing, men's middleweight (75 kg)
 Félix Savón — Boxing, men's heavyweight (91 kg)
 Omar Ajete, José Ariel Contreras, Miguel Caldes, José Estrada González, Jorge Fumero, Alberto Hernández, Rey Isaac, Orestes Kindelán, Pedro Lazo, Omar Linares, Omar Luis, Juan Manrique, Eliecer Montes, Antonio Pacheco, Juan Padilla, Eduardo Paret, Ormari Romero, Antonio Scull, Luis Ulacia and Lázaro Vargas — Baseball, men's tournament
 Driulis González — Judo, women's lightweight (56 kg) 
 Pablo Lara — Weightlifting, men's middleweight (76 kg)
 Feliberto Ascuy — Wrestling, men's Greco-Roman welterweight (74 kg) 
 Taismari Aguero, Regla Bell, Magaly Carvajal, Marlenis Costa, Ana Fernández, Mirka Francia, Idalmis Gato, Lilia Izquierdo, Mireya Luis, Raiza O'Farrill, Yumilka Ruíz and Regla Torres — Volleyball, women's tournament

Silver
 Ana Fidelia Quirot — Athletics, women's 800 metres
 Arnaldo Mesa — Boxing, Men's bantamweight (54 kg)
 Juan Hernández Sierra — Boxing, men's welterweight (67 kg)
 Alfredo Duvergel — Boxing, men's light middleweight (71 kg)
 Iván Trevejo — Fencing, men's épée individual 
 Estela Rodríguez — Judo, women's heavyweight 
 Rodolfo Falcón — Swimming, men's 100m backstroke 
 Juan Marén — Wrestling, men's Greco-Roman featherweight (62 kg)

Bronze
 Yoelbi Quesada — Athletics, Men's triple jump
 Oscar García, Elvis Gregory and Rolando Tucker — Fencing, men's foil team competition
 Israel Hernández — Judo, men's half lightweight (65 kg)
 Amarilis Savón — Judo, women's extra lightweight (48 kg) 
 Legna Verdecia — Judo, women's half lightweight (52 kg)
 Diadenis Luna — Judo, women's half heavyweight (72 kg)
 Neisser Bent — Swimming, men's 100m backstroke 
 Alexis Vila — Wrestling, men's freestyle paperweight (48 kg)

Athletics

Men's 4 × 400 m relay
 Omar Meña, Jorge Crusellas, Georkis Vera and Robert Hernández
 Heat — 3:05.75 (→ did not advance)

Men's long jump
 Jaime Jefferson
 Qualification — 7.65m (→ did not advance)

Men's decathlon 
 Eugenio Balanque 
 Final result — 7873 points (→ 25th place)
 Raul Duany 
 Final result — 7802 points (→ 26th place)

Men's discus throw 
 Alexis Elizalde
 Qualification — 62.22m
 Final — 62.70m (→ 9th place)
 Roberto Moya
 Qualification — 59.22m (→ did not advance)

Men's hammer throw 
 Alberto Sánchez
 Qualification — 74.82m (→ did not advance)

Women's 4x400 metres relay 
 Idalmis Bonne, Julia Duporty, Surella Morales and Ana Fidelia Quirot
 Qualification — 3:24.23
 Final — 3:25.85 (→ 6th place)

Women's long jump
Regla Cardenas
 Qualification — 6.85m (→ did not advance)
Lisette Cuza
 Qualification — 6.56m (→ did not advance)
Niurka Montalvo
 Qualification — 6.48m (→ did not advance)

Women's high jump
 Ioamnet Quintero
 Qualification — 1.90m (→ did not advance)

Women's triple jump
 Yamile Aldama
 Qualification — did not start (→ no ranking)

Women's javelin throw
 Isel Lopez
 Qualification — 61.40m
 Final — 64.68m (→ 4th place)
 Xiomara Rivero
 Qualification — 61.32m
 Final — 64.48m (→ 5th place)
 Odelmys Palma
 Qualification — 62.30m
 Final — 59.70m (→ 11th place)

Women's discus throw 
 Maritza Marten 
 Qualification — 60.08m (→ did not advance)
 Barbara Hechevarria 
 Qualification — 61.98m (→ did not advance)

Women's shot put
 Belsis Laza
 Qualification — 18.61m
 Final — 18.40m (→ 10th place)
 Yumileidis Cumba 
 Qualification — 18.55m (→ did not advance)

Women's heptathlon 
 Regla Cardenas
 Final result — 6246 points (→ 12th place)
 Magalys García
 Final result — 6109 points (→ 15th place)

Baseball

Men's tournament:
 Cuba -  Gold medal (9-0)

Basketball

Women's tournament

Team roster
Yudith Águila
Milayda Enríquez
Gertrudis Gómez
Cariola Hechavarría
Dalia Henry
Grisel Herrera
Biosotis Lagnó
María León
Yamilé Martínez
Tania Seino
Lisdeivis Víctores
Olga Vigil
Head coach: Miguel del Rio Lopez
Preliminary round

Quarterfinals

Classification Round 5th−8th place

5th place game

Beach volleyball

Francisco Alvarez and Juan Rossell — 7th place overall

Boxing

Men's light flyweight (– 48 kg)
Yosvani Aguilera
 First round — Defeated Stefan Ström (Sweden), referee stopped contest in second round
 Second round — Lost to Mansueto Velasco (Philippines), 5-14

Men's flyweight (– 51 kg)
Maikro Romero →  Gold medal
 First round — Defeated Eric Morel (United States), 24-12 
 Second round — Defeated Lernik Papyan (Armenia), 22-6 
 Quarterfinals — Defeated Elias Recaido (Philippines), 18-3 
 Semifinals — Defeated Albert Pakeyev (Russia), 12-6 
 Final — Defeated Bulat Jumadilov (Kazakhstan), 12-11

Men's bantamweight (– 54 kg)
Arnaldo Mesa →  Silver medal
 First round — Defeated John Larbi (Sweden), 19-5 
 Second round — Defeated Zahir Raheem (United States), referee stopped contest in first round
 Quarterfinals — Defeated Rachid Bouaita (France), 15-8 
 Semifinals — Defeated Raimkul Malakhbekov (Russia), 14-14, referee decision
 Final — Lost to István Kovács (Hungary), 7-14

Men's featherweight (– 57 kg)
Lorenzo Aragón
 First round — Defeated Noureddine Magjhound (Algeria), 9-6 
 Second round — Defeated Rogelio de Brito (Brazil), 16-6 
 Quarterfinals — Lost to Floyd Mayweather Jr. (United States), 11-12

Men's lightweight (– 60 kg)
Julio González Valladares
 First round — Defeated Romeo Brin (Philippines), 24-13 
 Second round — Lost to Koba Gogoladze (Georgia), 9-14

Men's light welterweight (– 63.5 kg)
Héctor Vinent →  Gold medal
 First round — Defeated Hyung-Min Han (South Korea), referee stopped contest in second round
 Second round — Defeated Nurhan Suleymanoglu (Turkey), 23-1 
 Quarterfinals — Defeated Eduard Zakharov (Russia), 15-7 
 Semifinals — Defeated Bolat Niyazymbetov (Kazakhstan), 23-6 
 Final — Defeated Oktay Urkal (Germany), 20-13

Men's welterweight (– 67 kg)
Juan Hernández Sierra →  Silver medal
 First round — Defeated József Nagy (Hungary), referee stopped contest in second round
 Second round — Defeated Vadim Mezga (Belarus), 12-2 
 Quarterfinals — Defeated Nurzhan Smanov (Kazakhstan), 16-8 
 Semifinals — Defeated Marian Simion (Romania), 20-7 
 Final — Lost to Oleg Saitov (Russia), 9-14

Men's light middleweight (– 71 kg)
Alfredo Duvergel →  Silver medal
 First round — Defeated Jozef Gilewski (Poland), 10-2 
 Second round — Defeated Serguei Gorodnychov (Ukraine), 15-2 
 Quarterfinals — Defeated Antonio Perugino (Italy), 15-8
 Semifinals — Defeated Yermakhan Ibraimov (Kazakhstan), 28-19 
 Final — Lost to David Reid (United States), knock-out in third round

Men's middleweight (– 75 kg)
Ariel Hernández →  Gold medal
 First round — Defeated Kabary Salem (Egypt), 11-2 
 Second round — Defeated Sven Ottke (Germany), 5-0 
 Quarterfinals — Defeated Alexander Lebziak (Russia), 15-8 
 Semifinals — Defeated Rhoshii Wells (United States), 17-8 
 Final — Defeated Malik Beyleroğlu (Turkey), 11-3

Men's light heavyweight (– 81 kg)
Freddy Rojas
 First round — Defeated Mahmoud Kalifa (Egypt), 20-9
 Second round — Lost to Lee Seung-Bao (South Korea), 9-13

Men's heavyweight (91 kg)
Félix Savón →  Gold medal
 First round — Defeated Andrei Kumyaavka (Kyrgyzstan), 9-3 
 Second round — Defeated Kwamena Turkson (Sweden), knock-out in first round
 Quarterfinals — Defeated Georgi Kandelaki (Georgia), 20-4 
 Semifinals — Defeated Luan Krasniqi (Germany), walkover 
 Final — Defeated David Defiagbon (Canada), 20-2

Men's super heavyweight (> 91 kg)
Alexis Rubalcaba
 First round — Bye
 Second round — Defeated Paolo Vidoz (Italy), referee stopped contest in first round
 Quarterfinals — Lost to Paea Wolfgramm (Tonga), 12-17

Cycling

Women's individual road race
Dania Perez 
 Final — did not finish (→ no ranking)

Fencing

Seven fencers, four men and three women, represented Cuba in 1996.

Men's foil
 Rolando Tucker
 Elvis Gregory
 Oscar García

Men's team foil
 Elvis Gregory, Oscar García, Rolando Tucker

Men's épée
 Iván Trevejo

Women's épée
 Mirayda García
 Milagros Palma
 Tamara Esteri

Women's team épée
 Milagros Palma, Mirayda García, Tamara Esteri

Judo

Men's extra-lightweight
Manolo Poulot

Men's half-lightweight
Israel Hernández

Men's middleweight
Yosvany Despaigne

Men's half-heavyweight
Angel Sánchez

Men's heavyweight
Frank Moreno 

Women's extra-lightweight
Amarilys Savón

Women's half-lightweight
Legna Verdecia

Women's lightweight
Driulys González

Women's half-middleweight
Ileana Beltrán

Women's middleweight
Odalis Revé

Women's half-heavyweight
Diadenys Luña

Women's heavyweight
Estela Rodríguez

Rowing

Sailing

Shooting

Men

Swimming

Men's 100m backstroke
 Rodolfo Falcón
 Heat — 55.29
 Final — 54.98 (→  Silver medal)
 Neisser Bent
 Heat — 54.83
 Final — 55.02 (→  Bronze medal)

Men's 200m backstroke
 Rodolfo Falcón
 Heat — 2:01.20
 Final — 2:08.14 (→ 8th place)
 Neisser Bent
 Heat — 2:04.23 (→ did not advance, 20th place)

Men's 100m breaststroke
 Mario González
 Heat — 1:03.05 (→ did not advance, 20th place)

Men's 200m breaststroke
 Mario González
 Heat — 2:16.15
 B final — 2:15.11 (→ 10th place)

Volleyball

Men's indoor tournament
Preliminary round (Group A)
 Defeated Bulgaria (3-0)
 Defeated Poland (3-0)
 Defeated United States (3-2)
 Defeated Argentina (3-0)
 Lost to Brazil (0-3)
Quarterfinals
 Lost to Russia (0-3)
Classification matches
 5th/8th place: Defeated Bulgaria (3-1)
 5th/6th place: Lost to Brazil (0-3) → 6th place
Team roster
Alexis Batle 
Angel Beltrán 
Freddy Brooks 
Joel Despaigne 
Raúl Diago 
Jhosvany Hernández 
Osvaldo Hernández 
Lazaro Martín 
Alain Roca 
Rodolfo Sanchez 
Ricardo Vantes
Nicolas Vives

Women's indoor tournament
Team roster
Taismary Agüero 
Regla Bell 
Magalys Carvajal 
Marlenys Costa 
Ana Fernández 
Mirka Francia 
Idalmis Gato 
Lilia Izquierdo 
Mireya Luis 
Raisa O'Farril 
Yumilka Ruíz 
Regla Torres 
Head coach: Eugenio Jorge

Weightlifting

Men's bantamweight
William Vargas

Men's lightweight
Idalberto Aranda

Men's middleweight
Pablo Lara

Men's middle-heavyweight
Carlos Alexis Hernández
Enrique Sabari

Wrestling

Men's light-flyweight, Greco-Roman
Wilber Sánchez Amita

Men's flyweight, Greco-Roman
Lázaro Rivas

Men's bantamweight, Greco-Roman
Luis Sarmiento

Men's featherweight, Greco-Roman
Juan Luis Marén

Men's lightweight, Greco-Roman
Liubal Colás

Men's welterweight, Greco-Roman
Filiberto Azcuy

Men's light-heavyweight, Greco-Roman
Reynaldo Peña

Men's heavyweight, Greco-Roman
Héctor Milián

Men's light-flyweight, freestyle
Alexis Vila

Men's flyweight, freestyle
Carlos Varela González

Men's bantamweight, freestyle
Alejandro Puerto

Men's lightweight, freestyle
Yosvany Sánchez

Men's welterweight, freestyle
Alberto Rodríguez Hernández

Men's middleweight, freestyle
Ariel Ramos

Men's heavyweight, freestyle
Wilfredo Morales

See also
 Cuba at the 1995 Pan American Games

Notes

References

Nations at the 1996 Summer Olympics
1996
1996 in Cuban sport